Leopard tree is a common name for several plants and may refer to:

Libidibia ferrea, a leguminous tree found in South America
Flindersia maculosa, an Australian tree of the citrus family